The crested kingfisher (Megaceryle lugubris) is a very large kingfisher that is native to parts of southern Asia, stretching eastwards from the Indian Subcontinent towards Japan. It forms a species complex with the other three Megaceryle species.

Taxonomy
The first formal description of the crested kingfisher was by the Dutch zoologist Coenraad Jacob Temminck in 1834 under the binomial name Alcedo lugubris. The current genus Megaceryle was erected by the German naturalist Johann Jakob Kaup in 1848. Megaceryle is from the Ancient Greek megas, "great", and the existing genus Ceryle. The specific name lugubris is the Latin word for "mournful".

There are four subspecies:
 M. l. continentalis (Hartert, 1900) – Himalayas, from Afghanistan to Bhutan
 M. l. guttulata (Stejneger, 1892) – Bhutan to Vietnam, China and North Korea
 M. l. pallida (Momiyama, 1927) – northern Japan (Hokkaido), southern Kuril Islands
 M. l. lugubris (Temminck, 1834) – central and southern Japan (Honshu, Shikoku and Kyushu)

Description
The crested kingfisher is a very large  black and white kingfisher with a shaggy crest. It has evenly barred wings and tail. It lacks a supercilium and has a spotted breast, which is sometimes mixed with rufous.

Range and habitat

It is resident in the Himalayas and mountain foothills of northern India, Bangladesh, northern Indochina, Southeast Asia and Japan. This bird is mainly found in mountain rivers and larger rivers in the foothills of mountains.

Behaviour

Breeding
The nest is a burrow excavated into a vertical bank in a forest. The burrow is dug by both sexes using their feet and bills. The clutch of 4-7 eggs is incubated only by the female. The nestlings are fed by both parents for around 40 days before they fledge.

Status
A decline has been noted in northeastern China. Declines have been linked to habitat destruction.

References

External links
Xeno-canto: audio recordings of the crested kingfisher

crested kingfisher
crested kingfisher
Birds of the Himalayas
Birds of Eastern Himalaya
Birds of East Asia
Birds of Hainan
Birds of Hong Kong
Birds of Myanmar
Birds of Laos
Birds of Vietnam
crested kingfisher